Little Reed Heights is a former unincorporated community now incorporated in Tiburon in Marin County, California. It lies at an elevation of 75 feet (23 m).

References

Neighborhoods in Tiburon, California
Populated coastal places in California